St Matthew's Church, Saltney, was in Flint Road, Saltney, Flintshire, Wales.

The church was opened in 1911 as a mission church to the parish church of St Mark, Saltney.  St Mark's Church is an Anglican church in the parish of Lache cum Saltney, the deanery of Chester, the archdeaconry of Chester and the diocese of Chester.

St Matthew's was designed by the Chester architect John Douglas and built in brick with lancet windows.  It was intended to have a longer nave and a tower at the northwest, but these were never completed.  Its plan consisted of a broad nave and a chancel with a south aisle.  In the series The Buildings of Wales, Edward Hubbard expressed the opinion that the church was "not impressive externally" although "the interior is more rewarding".

After the church became redundant, it was closed on 4 June 2000.  The building was destroyed by fire in December 2008.

See also
List of new churches by John Douglas
List of churches in Flintshire

References

Churches completed in 1911
20th-century Church in Wales church buildings
Saltney Ferry, St Matthew's Church
Saltney Ferry, St Matthew's Church
Saltney Ferry, St Matthew's Church
Saltney Ferry, St Matthew's Church